Antipodogomphus is a genus of dragonflies in the family Gomphidae, 
endemic to Australia.
The species are small to medium-sized with black with yellow markings. They are commonly known as dragons.

Species
The genus Antipodogomphus includes the following species:

Antipodogomphus acolythus  - southern dragon
Antipodogomphus dentosus  - Top End dragon
Antipodogomphus edentulus  - Cape York dragon
Antipodogomphus hodgkini  - Pilbara dragon
Antipodogomphus neophytus  - northern dragon
Antipodogomphus proselythus  - spinehead dragon

References

Gomphidae
Anisoptera genera
Odonata of Australia
Endemic fauna of Australia
Taxa named by Frederic Charles Fraser
Insects described in 1951